Tshwane Suns is a basketball team located in Tshwane, South Africa. 
The team competes in South Africa's highest division, the Basketball National League (BNL). Founded in 1996, they have won the BNL championship four times, in 2013, 2014, 2017 and 2022.

Arena
Like all other teams in the Basketball National League, the Suns play their games at the Wembley Stadium, in Stafford, Gauteng, City of Johannesburg Metropolitan Municipality, a former ice rink which holds up to 3,000 visitors.

Notable players
- Set a club record or won an individual award as a professional player.
- Played at least one official international match for his senior national team at any time.
  Lehlogonolo Tholo
  Kagiso Ngoetjana
  Larry Jackson
   Nikola Jokanović

Head coach position
   Nikola Jokanović (2006)
  George Makena (2006–2017)
  Giannis Grapsas - 2019
  Terry Nxumalo (2020)

References

External links
Presentation at league website
Profile at afrobasket.com
Profile at facebook.com
Profile at instagram.com
Profile at twitter.com

Basketball teams in South Africa
City of Tshwane Metropolitan Municipality
Sport in Gauteng
Basketball teams established in 1996